Myristica tubiflora is a species of tree in the family Myristicaceae native to New Guinea.

References 

tubiflora
Flora of New Guinea